The Hum Award for Best Model Male is one of the Hum Awards presented annually by the Hum Television Network and Entertainment Channel (HTNEC) to Male model who has achieved outstanding recognition within the fashion industry. Since its inception, however, the award has commonly been referred to as the hum for Best Model Male. Nominations are made by Hum members who are models and fashion models, and winners are decided by audience votes, as of first ceremony this was one of seven categories which were set open for public.

History
Hum Television Network and Entertainment Channel presented this award to one of the most promising Male Model of fashion Industry of Pakistan. As of first ceremony Abbas Jafri was honored at 1st Hum Awards ceremony 2012 for his spectacular fashion achievements by audience.

Winners and nominees
In the list below, winners are listed first in the colored row, followed by the other nominees. As of the first ceremony, five models were nominated for their achievements for this award.   

Date and the award ceremony shows that the 2010 is the period from 2010-2020 (10 years-decade), while the year above winners and nominees shows their fashion achievements year, and the figure in bracket shows the ceremony number, for example; an award ceremony is held for their achievements of its previous year.

2010s

See also 
 Hum Awards
 Hum Awards pre-show
 List of Hum Awards Ceremonies

References

External links
Official websites
 Hum Awards official website
 Hum Television Network and Entertainment Channel (HTNEC)
 Hum's Channel at YouTube (run by the Hum Television Network and Entertainment Channel)
 Hum Awards at Facebook (run by the Hum Television Network and Entertainment Channel)]

Hum Awards
Hum Award winners
Hum TV
Hum Network Limited